Liechtenstein competed at the 1952 Summer Olympics in Helsinki, Finland.

Results by event

Cycling

Road Competition
Men's Individual Road Race (190.4 km)
Alois Lampert — 5:20:06.6 (→ 30th place)
Ewald Hasler — 5:23:34.8 (→ 43rd place)

References
Official Olympic Reports

Nations at the 1952 Summer Olympics
1952
1952 in Liechtenstein